The 2015 WNBA season for the Washington Mystics of the Women's National Basketball Association was scheduled to begin June 5, 2015.

Transactions

WNBA Draft

In the first round of the 2015 WNBA Draft, the Washington Mystics selected Ally Malott from University of Dayton as the eighth pick. The Mystics selected Natasha Cloud from Saint Joseph's University in the second round with the fifteenth overall pick, and Maria Gajic from Bosnia in the third round with the thirty-second overall pick.

Trades

Roster

Season standings

Schedule

Playoffs

They lost to the New York Liberty twice in the playoffs.

Awards and honors

References

External links
The Official Site of the Washington Mystics

Washington Mystics seasons
Washington
Washington Mystics